Griggstown  is an unincorporated community and census-designated place (CDP) located within Franklin Township, in Somerset County, New Jersey, United States. As of the 2010 United States Census, the CDP's population was 819. The area was first settled around 1733.

History
Many of the earliest European settlers of the area came from Gravesend, Brooklyn. Among these settlers were four sons born to John and Elizabeth Griggs: Benjamin (b. 1690), Daniel, Samuel, and Thomas. Griggstown was named after Benjamin Griggs, who established a grist mill on the Millstone River that served as a meeting place for the European farmers of the area and as such the center of the community that would become Griggstown.

Geography
According to the United States Census Bureau, the CDP had a total area of 2.519 square miles (6.524 km2), including 2.447 square miles (6.338 km2) of land and 0.072 square miles (0.187 km2) of water (2.86%).

Griggstown is adjacent to the communities of Kingston, Rocky Hill, Montgomery Township, Kendall Park (in South Brunswick), and Franklin Park. The closest city of note is Princeton, New Jersey. The Millstone River and the Delaware and Raritan Canal both flow through Griggstown.

Griggstown is accessible via Route 27 (Lincoln Highway), County Route 518 and U.S. Route 206. The major roads in Griggstown are Bunker Hill Road and Canal Road. There is also a small access road with a one-lane bridge(at one time referred to as "twin bridges") known as the Griggstown Causeway that offers access to and from Griggstown as well. The D&R Canal State Park is located on this road in conjunction with the canal side tow-path.

Selected sites
 Griggstown Quail Farm
 Griggstown Cemetery where nineteen Irish canal workers who died of cholera in an 1832-1833 epidemic are buried.
 Griggstown Volunteer Fire Company
 Griggstown Lock of the Delaware and Raritan Canal
 Griggstown Mine
 Norseville
 Sunset Hill Garden

Demographics

Census 2010

Historic district

The Griggstown Historic District is a  national historic district encompassing the community along Canal Road from Old Georgetown Road to Ten Mile Run. It was added to the National Register of Historic Places on August 2, 1984 for its significance in agriculture, architecture, commerce, industry, and transportation. The district includes 68 contributing buildings. The Griggstown Reformed Church was established in 1842 as the First Reformed Protestant Dutch Church of Griggstown. The building was dedicated on August 8, 1843 and features Greek Revival architecture. The Bridge Tender's House, the Bridge Tender’s Station and the Lock Tender's House, all built for the Delaware and Raritan Canal, are contributing buildings.

Notable people

People who were born in, residents of, or otherwise closely associated with Griggstown include:
 Benjamin Griggs (1690-1768), founder of the grist mill after which Griggstown took its name. 
 John Honeyman (1729-1822), American spy for George Washington. He was primarily responsible for gathering the intelligence crucial to Washington's victory in the Battle of Trenton.
 Paul Muldoon (born 1951) writer, academic and educator, as well as Pulitzer Prize-winning poet originally from County Armagh, Northern Ireland.

Gallery

See also
 National Register of Historic Places listings in Somerset County, New Jersey

References

External links
 
 

Census-designated places in Somerset County, New Jersey
Franklin Township, Somerset County, New Jersey